Fatehpur Talratoy is a village located in Madhuban tehsil of Mau district in Uttar Pradesh, India. It has total 196 families residing. Fatehpur Talratoy has population of 1324 as per government records.

Administration
Fatehpur Talratoy village is administrated by Pradhan who is elected representative of village as per constitution of India and Panchyati Raj Act.

Tal Ratoy
Ratoy Taal is a natural lake near village Fatehpur-Talratoy, having an area of approximately 1837 hectares. A canal connects it to nearby Sarayu (Ghaghara) river. It's a source of irrigation for local farmers. However it is also a major tourist destination and picnic spot for local people.

Babarnama
Mughal emperor Ẓahīr-ud-Dīn Muhammad Babar had made special mention of this beautiful lake in his journal 'Babarnama'. He spent a night near this taal during expedition towards eastern part of India.

Mythology
According to Hindu mythology, Ratoi Taal was dug by Asur Mahahanu. Asur Mahahanu fought a battle with Devi Bhageshwari and got annihilated. As per the mythological story, Asur Mahahanu wanted to marry Devi Bhageshwari and send a proposal through his messengers. Devi put a condition before him that if he connects Ratoi Taal with the river Sarayu by digging a canal overnight, she would accept his offer. Asur Mahahanu failed to do so; however, he tried to forcefully marry Devi Bhageshwari and was killed in the battle.

References

External links
Villages in Mau Uttar Pradesh

Villages in Mau district